Elections were held in the Colony of Queensland (now a state of Australia) between 8 July 1871 and 6 September 1871 to elect the members of the Legislative Assembly of Queensland.

Key dates
Due to problems of distance and communications, it was not possible to hold the elections on a single day.

See also
 Members of the Queensland Legislative Assembly, 1871–1873

References

Elections in Queensland
1871 elections in Australia
July 1871 events
August 1871 events
September 1871 events
1870s in Queensland